MycoWorks is a biotechnology company based in Emeryville, California, with the mission to create the highest quality materials using mycelium. The company was founded in 2013 by Philip Ross, Sophia Wang, and Eddie Pavlu.

History 
Co-founder and chief technical officer Phil Ross's work with mycelium began before the formation of the company, which has assisted in the company's developments. In 2017, Matthew L. Scullin signed on as chief executive officer. In early 2020, the company raised Series A financing, and later that year, $45 million in Series B financing with Natalie Portman and John Legend participating.

Technology  
Fine Mycelium is a patented technology by MycoWorks that engineers mycelium cells during their growth to form proprietary, interlocking cellular structures for unparalleled strength and durability. Fine Mycelium is a breakthrough in materials science and biotechnology that refers both to MycoWorks’ proprietary process and to a new category of materials used in the fashion, footwear, automotive, and decor industry that are exclusive to MycoWorks.

Products 
Reishi is the first commercially available product from MycoWorks. MycoWorks expects brand partners to release the first products made with Reishi in 2021.

See also

References

External links 
 

Companies based in San Francisco
Technology companies based in the San Francisco Bay Area
Biotechnology in the United States
2013 establishments in California
Fungi in cultivation